Dmitri Alekseyevich Samoylov (born 25 September 1993) is a Russian football player who plays for FC Shinnik Yaroslavl.

Club career
He made his debut in the Russian Professional Football League for FC Energomash Belgorod on 20 July 2015 in a game against FC Torpedo Moscow.

He made his Russian Football National League debut for FC Shinnik Yaroslavl on 8 July 2017 in a game against FC Zenit-2 Saint Petersburg.

References

External links
 Profile by Russian Professional Football League

1993 births
People from Belgorod
Sportspeople from Belgorod Oblast
Living people
Russian footballers
Association football midfielders
FC Energomash Belgorod players
FC Shinnik Yaroslavl players
Russian First League players
Russian Second League players